Proflight Zambia is an airline based in Lusaka, Zambia that serves the business community and tourism industry. It is a trading name of Proflight Commuter Services Ltd. Proflight Zambia operates the largest fleet of aircraft in Zambia, operating both scheduled and charter flights. The airline has been growing rapidly in recent years and is the largest airline in Zambia by routes served and fleet size.

History 
Proflight Air Services was founded in 1991 by pilot Tony Irwin, formerly of Zambia Airways. On 30 June 2009 the airline was authorized by the Zambia Competition Commission to form an alliance with Zambezi Airlines. The airline was officially rebranded as Proflight Zambia in 2010.

In March 2013 Proflight took delivery of its first jet aircraft, a Boeing 737-200, and later in 2013 began regional scheduled service to Lilongwe, Malawi, and Dar es Salaam, Tanzania, although the Boeing was returned to the lessor, Star Air Cargo, in 2014.

Corporate affairs

Business trends 
Proflight is privately owned and not much figures are made public.

Head Office 
Proflight Zambia has its headquarters at 13396 Kamloops Avenue (Munali Roundabout), in Lusaka.  It relocated there in August 2014.

Destinations 
Proflight Zambia flies domestic routes to Livingstone, Mfuwe, Lower Zambezi, Ndola and Solwezi out of Lusaka, regional routes to Johannesburg and Durban in South Africa. Although, the Durban route was temporarily suspended due to COVID-19. The airline also flies to Cape Town through Airlink South Africa.

Fleet 
The Proflight Zambia fleet includes the following aircraft (as of March 2022):

References

External links 
Official website
Proflight flights to Lower Zambezi
Proflight flights to South Luangwa

Airlines of Zambia
Airlines established in 1991
1991 establishments in Zambia
Companies based in Lusaka